Mitchell B. Reiss (born June 12, 1957) is an American diplomat, academic, and business leader who served as the 8th President and CEO of The Colonial Williamsburg Foundation, the 27th president of Washington College and in the United States Department of State.

Education 
Reiss earned a Bachelor of Arts degree from Williams College, a Master of Arts from the Fletcher School of Law and Diplomacy at Tufts University, a Juris Doctor from Columbia Law School, and a D.Phil. from the University of Oxford.

Career

Diplomacy 
Reiss served as Director of Policy Planning at the United States Department of State from 2003 to 2005. He also concurrently served as the United States Special Envoy for Northern Ireland, with the title of Ambassador, from 2003 to 2007. He was also selected to be a White House Fellow and was assigned to the National Security Council, where he worked both as Special Assistant for Brent Scowcroft and Colin Powell.

As a Special Envoy to Northern Ireland, he worked closely with the British and Irish governments to persuade the political parties representing Northern Ireland's two “traditions” to finally end the “Troubles” and restore local government. Reiss was instrumental in the denying of Gerry Adams a visa to the United States, to spur the endorsement of policing and justice in Northern Ireland by Adams and his political party, Sinn Féin.

From 1995 to 1999, he was Chief Negotiator in the Korean Peninsula Energy Development Organization, an organization established by the United States, South Korea, and Japan to implement the Agreed Framework on preventing nuclear proliferation on the Korean peninsula. He has served on the National Security Council, the Council on Foreign Relations, the State Department, Lawrence Livermore National Laboratory and has consulted for Los Alamos National Laboratory.
Previously, he was Vice-Provost for International Affairs, Professor of Law at the William and Mary Law School, and Professor of Government in the Department of Government at the College of William and Mary.

In 2016, the UK Government appointed Reiss as its representative to the four-person International Reporting Commission to help end paramilitary activities in Northern Ireland.

Career 
Reiss practiced general corporate and banking law at Covington & Burling from 1989 to 1992.

Reiss also served as a national security advisor to then-Governor Mitt Romney during his 2008 and 2012 presidential campaigns.

Reiss was the 27th President of Washington College from 2010 to 2014, where he internationalized the student body, raised SAT scores and lowered the discount rate, created an innovative three-year pathway to graduation to reduce student and family debt, and balanced the budget for four straight years.

Reiss was the 8th President and CEO of The Colonial Williamsburg Foundation, America's largest living history museum, from October 2014 until October 2019, where he focused on restoring the institution's financial health and fulfilling its educational mission. Reiss managed $1.1 billion of assets, led 2,000 employees and 1,000 volunteers, and stewarded over 100,000 donors. He generated profitable commercial operations for the first time in Foundation history, achieved four straight years of record fund-raising, won reaccreditation from the American Alliance of Museums, and recruited and retained the most diverse leadership team in Foundation history.

Personal life 
Mitchell is married to Elisabeth Reiss. They have two children.

Books
 Negotiating with Evil: When to Talk to Terrorists, ASIN B003MZ14OQ
 Bridled Ambition: Why Countries Constrain Their Nuclear Capabilities, 
 Without the Bomb: The Politics of Nuclear Non-proliferation, 
 Nuclear Proliferation after the Cold War (co-editor/author), 
 The Nuclear Tipping-Point (editor),

References

External links
 Washington College — Official Washington College Website
 Mitchell B. Reiss — official biography from the United States Department of State
 NI special envoy appointed — BBC News article, 12 December 2003
 Reiss' current blog at ForeignPolicy.com
 Reiss' bio at ForeignPolicy.com

American diplomats
Politics of Northern Ireland
Living people
Williams College alumni
The Fletcher School at Tufts University alumni
Columbia Law School alumni
College of William & Mary faculty
Presidents of Washington College
1957 births
Directors of Policy Planning
United States Special Envoys